Charles Edward Rice (August 7, 1931 – February 25, 2015) was an American legal scholar, Catholic apologist, and author of several books. He is best known for his career at the Notre Dame Law School at Notre Dame, Indiana. He began teaching there in 1969, and in 2000 earned professor emeritus status. During the time he was retired, he continued to teach classes at the University of Notre Dame until 2014.

Personal life
Rice was of Irish descent and his father was active in Irish-American and Catholic organizations in New York City. He lived with his wife, Mary, in Mishawaka, Indiana. They had 10 biological children and 41 grandchildren, and adopted a son from South Vietnam.

Education & legal career

Rice received the B.A. degree from the College of the Holy Cross, the J.D. from Boston College Law School and the LL.M. and J.S.D. from New York University. He practiced law in New York City and taught at New York University Law School and Fordham Law School before joining, in 1969, the faculty of law at Notre Dame.

Career

He was instrumental in the founding of the Conservative Party of New York in the 1960s. He served as vice-chairman of the party from 1962 to 1969.

Rice served in the Marine Corps and was a retired lieutenant colonel who served in the Marine Corps Reserve.

From 1981 to 1993, Rice was a member of the Education Appeal Board of the United States Department of Education. He also served as a consultant to the United States Commission on Civil Rights and to various Congressional committees on constitutional issues and was an editor of the American Journal of Jurisprudence. He was a member of the governing boards of Franciscan University of Steubenville and the Eternal Word Television Network. He served as chairman of the Center for Law and Justice International in New Hope, Kentucky, and a director of the Thomas More Law Center in Ann Arbor. He was an assistant coach of the Notre Dame Boxing Club.

Rice was one of the co-founders of Ave Maria School of Law in Ann Arbor, Michigan. He is also a board member of Blackstone Fellowship the Christian conservative legal training program run by Alliance Defending Freedom.

Publications

Video lectures
Rice made several video lectures on Natural Law Theory and other topics, including The Good Code for EWTN, Right Reason with Dr. Charles Rice alongside Michael Voris for Church Militant.tv, and Natural Law: What It Is and Why We Need It for International Catholic University.

Books

Columns 
Rice was a regular columnist for The Irish Rover, a student-run newspaper serving the University of Notre Dame campus.

References

 http://law.nd.edu/people/faculty-and-administration/teaching-and-research-emeriti-faculty/charles-e-rice
 Rice, Charles E. (1990). No Exception: A Pro-Life Imperative. Human Life International.

1931 births
Alliance Defending Freedom people
University of Notre Dame faculty
College of the Holy Cross alumni
Boston College Law School alumni
New York University School of Law alumni
United States Marine Corps officers
New York University faculty
Fordham University faculty
Ave Maria School of Law faculty
Notre Dame Law School faculty
Conservative Party of New York State politicians
People from Mishawaka, Indiana
People from St. Joseph County, Indiana
2015 deaths
American political party founders
American legal scholars
20th-century American novelists
21st-century American novelists